{{Infobox book
|name         = The Devotion of Suspect X
|title_orig   = Yōgisha X no Kenshin容疑者Xの献身
|translator   = Alexander O. Smith
|image        = Devotion of suspect x .jpg
|caption      = First edition (Japanese)
|author       = Keigo Higashino
|country      = Japan
|language     = Japanese
|series       = Detective Galileo
|genre        = Crime / Mystery novel
|published    = 2005 (Bungeishunjū) (Japanese)2011 (Minotaur Books) (English)
|media_type   = Print (Hardback & Paperback)
|pages        = 352 
|isbn         = 4-16-323860-3
|preceded_by  = Yochimu予知夢
|followed_by  = Salvation of a Saint聖女の救済
}}
 is a 2005 novel by Keigo Higashino, the third in his Detective Galileo series and is his most acclaimed work thus far. The novel won him numerous awards, including the 134th Naoki Prize, which is a highly regarded award in Japan. The novel also won the 6th Honkaku Mystery Award, which is one of the most prestigious awards in the mystery novels category in Japan. 2006 Honkaku Mystery Best 10 and Kono Mystery ga Sugoi! 2006, annual mystery fiction guide books published in Japan, ranked the novel as the number one.

The English translation was nominated for the 2012 Edgar Award for Best Novel and the 2012 Barry Award for Best First Novel.

Plot
The story begins with Tetsuya Ishigami and Yasuko Hanaoka following their daily routines. Yasuko Hanaoka is a divorced single mother who works at a bento shop. Ishigami is a highly talented mathematics teacher, who lives next door to Yasuko and her daughter Misato. When Togashi (Yasuko's abusive ex-husband) shows up one day to extort money from Yasuko, threatening both her and Misato, the situation quickly escalates into violence, and Togashi is killed by mother and daughter. Overhearing the commotion, Ishigami, who is secretly enamored of Yasuko but has never told her so, offers his help, disposing of the body and plotting the cover-up of the murder step-by-step.

When the body turns up and is identified, Kusanagi (the detective investigating the murder case) draws the case and Yasuko comes under suspicion. Kusanagi is unable to find any obvious holes in Yasuko's manufactured alibi, but still he is sure that there's something wrong with her story, a suspicion that he cannot shake. Kusanagi brings in Dr. Manabu Yukawa, a physicist and his college friend who frequently consults with the police. Yukawa also went to college with Ishigami, where he learned of Ishigami's problem-solving techniques and abilities; Yukawa highly rates Ishigami's intelligence. After meeting him again after so many years, Yukawa becomes convinced that Ishigami had something to do with the murder. What ensues is a high-level battle of wits between Yukawa and Ishigami, as Ishigami tries to protect Yasuko by outmaneuvering and outthinking Yukawa; the teacher is Yukawa's most clever and determined opponent yet.

Towards the end of the book, both Ishigami's scheme and the reason for his devotion to Yasuko are revealed: Ishigami had lost his will to live due to his depression, and was prepared to commit suicide when he was interrupted by Yasuko and Misato introducing themselves, leading him to become deeply attached to her and thankful for her unknowingly saving his life. In order to deceive the investigation, Ishigami murdered a second person, a homeless man who he had seen prior on his commute to work, and made the police believe he was Togashi, in order to obfuscate the time of the murder and make it so that in the end he could take the fall.

Yukawa is ultimately able to figure out his scheme and cannot accept his friend's sacrifice, and so he tells Yasuko the truth. She is deeply moved and despite Ishigami's instructions to move forward, is unable to live with the guilt. The book ends with her meeting Ishigami in jail, revealing that she and Misato have confessed to killing Togashi and are determined to serve their sentence together with him, leaving him in tears.

Characters

Solitary Maths teacher who has fallen in love with Yasuko 

A single mother who murdered her ex-husband

Yasuko's daughter from a previous marriage
Manabu Yukawa
Tetsuya Ishigami's old college friend, both are as intelligent as the other.
Shunpei Kusanagi
Detective in charge of dealing with the case of Togashi's murder

Yasuko's ex-husband who stalked her and is later killed by her and her daughter, the victim of the crime under investigation

Awards and nominations
Japanese awards
2006 - Honkaku Mystery Award for Best Fiction
2006 - Naoki Prize
2006 - The Best Japanese Crime Fiction of the Year (Kono Mystery ga Sugoi! 2006)
2006 - The Best Japanese Crime Fiction of the Year (2006 Honkaku Mystery Best 10)
2012 - Ranked as the No. 13 novel on the Top 100 Japanese Mystery Novels of All Time

U.S. awards
2012 - Nominee for Edgar Award for Best Novel
2012 - Nominee for Barry Award for Best First Novel
2012 - Chosen by the American Library Association as Best Mystery Novel for their 2012 reading list

Adaptations
It was made into a 2008 Japanese film Suspect X, starring Shinichi Tsutsumi as Tetsuya Ishigami and Masaharu Fukuyama as Manabu Yukawa, directed by Hiroshi Nishitani.
The 2012 South Korean film adaptation Perfect Number (lit. "Suspect X") starred Ryoo Seung-bum, Lee Yo-won and Cho Jin-woong, and was directed by Bang Eun-jin.
The English language film adaptation rights were acquired by Kross Pictures in 2011, and is being developed in Los Angeles, California under the working title The Devotion of Suspect X.
It was also adapted into a 2019 Tamil movie titled Kolaigaran.
A Chinese film adaptation, The Devotion of Suspect X was released in 2017. The film was directed by Alec Su, and featured Ruby Lin and Wang Kai.
On March 16, 2022, Netflix announced the filming of an unnamed film directed by Sujoy Ghosh starring Kareena Kapoor with Jaideep Ahlawat and Vijay Varma based on The Devotion of Suspect X''.

See also
Galileo (Japanese TV series)

References

2005 Japanese novels
Novels by Keigo Higashino
Japanese novels adapted into films
Japanese crime novels
Japanese mystery novels
Japanese detective novels
Japanese-language novels